The Information Technology Secretary of Pakistan, also referred to as Secretary IT, is the Federal Secretary for the Ministry of Information Technology and Telecommunication. The position holder is a BPS-22 grade officer, usually belonging to the Pakistan Administrative Service. The position is considered to be a lucrative one and the position holder is ex officio the Chairman of the Board of Directors of Pakistan Telecommunication Company Limited.

References

Federal government ministries of Pakistan
Information ministers